The Istituto Adriano Olivetti di studi per la gestione dell'economia e delle aziende, known as ISTAO is a business school in Ancona, established in 1967 by the Italian economist Giorgio Fuà. ISTAO organizes post-graduate and executive courses as well as it gives its contribution in the field of Economy and Finance. ISTAO is named upon the name of Adriano Olivetti, the well-known entrepreneur who created and managed the Olivetti company and worked with Fuà during the '40s. ISTAO has been established in 1967 within the new Faculty of Economics of Ancona whereas a group of people, led by Giorgio Fuà, started to gain interest in finding new methodologies and techniques in teaching and research fields. According to this proposition, ISTAO developed during the years a methodology that makes it completely different from the Italian academic system and nowadays the business school is characterized by its tight link with the regional economic network (The "productive model") and by the managerial style of its teaching.

History 
Since the very first period of activity of the school, Fuà and his colleagues underlined the need of a professional preparation over the academic one.
During the '70s the base of the society is widened through the opening to the '’ founder members'’, the institutions and companies willing to contribute to the financial funding of the Institute, aside of the '’ordinary members'’ category, responsible of ensuring the scientific validity of School's initiatives. This structure is still on nowadays and it allowed ISTAO to host precious contributions in research and teaching activities by Italian and international professionals and experts.
In 1997 Fuà ceases the role of President (remaining as Honorary President until the death in 2000). First President after Fuà is Sabino Cassese, then Paolo Pettenati from 2000 to 2008, supported by vice-President Valeriano Balloni since 2004. The three-year period from 2008 to 2011 is represented by Adolfo Guzzini, one of the outstanding figure of Marche industry network, supported once more by Valeriano Balloni.
Starting from the academic year 2011–2012, the President is Andrea Merloni, President of Indesit Company, supported by Professor Gianluca Gregori, dean of the Faculty of Economics at Università Politecnica delle Marche.

Main courses 
Main post-graduate course taught at ISTAO is focused on strategy and management and it has been delivered every year for more than 40 years.
Alongside it, other postgraduate courses are organized, including International management and Finance for business.
ISTAO is in partnership with several foreign universities such as Ohio University and Masaryk University. The admission procedure involves different tests and interviews with a pool of ISTAO's professionals and representatives of companies and universities.

Premises 
 From 1967 to 1969: palazzo Arcivescovado, Ancona
 From 1969 to 1970: via Oddo Di Biagio 2, Ancona
 From 1970 to 1972: Corso Garibaldi 78, Ancona
 From 1972 to 1998: Villa Beer, via dell Grazie 7, Ancona
 From 1999: Villa Favorita, via Zuccarini 15, Ancona.

Presidents 
 From 1967 to 1997: Giorgio Fuà, Economist
 From 1997 to 2000: Sabino Cassese, jurist and judge of Italian Constitutional Court
 From 2000 to 2008: Paolo Pettenati, economist.
 From 2008 to 2011: Adolfo Guzzini, Entrepreneur and President of iGuzzini Illuminazione.
 From 2011: Andrea Merloni, Entrepreneur and President of Indesit Company

Opening classes 
Source:
 1974–75: Giorgio Ruffolo
 1977–78: Franco Modigliani
 1978–79: Filippo Maria Pandolfi
 1979–80: Antonio Giolitti
 1980–81: Giorgio La Malfa
 1981–82: Franco Reviglio
 1982–83: Giuseppe De Rita
 1983–84: Romano Prodi
 1984–85: Carlo De Benedetti
 1985–86: Carlo Azeglio Ciampi
 1986–87: Mario Schimberni
 1987–88: Cesare Romiti
 1988–89: Antonio Maccanico
 1989–90: Sergio Pininfarina
 1990–91: G. Dioguardi, G. Marongiu, S. Zoppi
 1991–92: Filippo Maria Pandolfi
 1993–94: Luigi Abete
 1994–95: Sabino Cassese
 1995–96: Attilio Zuliani
 1996–97: Giacomo Vaciago
 1997–98: Enrico Bondi
 1998–99: Sabino Cassese
 1999–00: Maurizio Sella, president ABI and CEO Banca Sella
 2000–01: Tommaso Padoa Schioppa, BCE
 2001–02: Angelo Tantazzi, president Prometeia srl and president Borsa Italiana spa
 2002–03: Luigi Spaventa, president Consob
 2003–04: Rainer Stefano Masera, president Sanpaolo IMI
 2004–05: Pietro Modiano, CEO Sanpaolo IMI
 2005–06: Francesco Caio, CEO Cable&Wireless
 2006–07: Andrea Guerra, CEO Luxottica
 2007–08: Vittorio Merloni, president Indesit Company
 2008–09: Roberto Poli, president ENI
 2009–10: Brunello Cucinelli, president Brunello Cucinelli Spa
 2010–11: Diego Della Valle, president Tod's
 2011–12: Innocenzo Cipolletta, president UBS Italia SIM Spa
 2012–13: Dominick Salvatore, economist and professor at Fordham University

References

Business schools in Italy